Williamsford is a village on the North Saugeen River in Grey County, Ontario, Canada (Chatsworth Township). It has a general store, Pie Company, post office, a bookstore  and restaurant housed in a historic grain mill. A small dam controls the North Saugeen River. It has several churches, and a community cemetery.  It is located on Highway 6 between Durham and Owen Sound.

The village of Williamsford was first surveyed in 1858 comprising 400 acres in preparation for a railway which was to run from Toronto to Owen Sound.  Each township was to contribute $40,000 to its construction.  The post office was built in 1847 and the general store was built in the late 1800s.

Recreation 
At the south end of the village sits the community centre grounds.  The grounds contain a playground, a baseball diamond and a newly built curling rink.  The curling rink which was completed in 2010 consists of a lounge and two rinks.

The community was previously served by a hockey arena with the original attached curling rink.  The arena was planned in 1954 and opened officially in 1956 and was torn down in 2008.

Transportation

Ontario Highway 6 passes through the Williamsford. The community is served by Kasper Transportation's Owen Sound to Guelph intercity bus route, which began operating in January 2020 with a fourteen-seat passenger van. There are two buses in each direction on Monday to Saturday, one in the morning and one in the afternoon.

See also
 Royal eponyms in Canada

References

Communities in Grey County